(Spanish for 'coffee of barley') may, depending on region, refer to:

, an espresso-like coffee substitute
Barley tea, a much lighter tisane (herbal tea) than 

Barley-based drinks